Andermatt is a surname. Notable people with the surname include:

Adrian Andermatt (born 1969), Swiss swimmer
Clara Andermatt (born 1963), Portuguese contemporary dancer and choreographer
Joseph Leonz Andermatt (1740–1817), Swiss general
Martin Andermatt (born 1961), Swiss footballer and manager
Werner Andermatt (1916–2013), Swiss painter